Jai Field (born 6 September 1997) is an Australian professional rugby league footballer who plays as a  and  for the Wigan Warriors in the Super League.

He previously played for the St. George Illawarra Dragons and the Parramatta Eels in the NRL.

Background
Field was born in Forbes , New South Wales, Australia, and is of Indigenous Australian (Wiradjuri) and Irish descent.

He played his junior rugby league for the Shellharbour Sharks, before being signed by the St. George Illawarra Dragons.

Playing career

2016
In 2016, Field played for the St. George Illawarra Dragons' NYC team. In December, he re-signed with the St. George club on a three-year contract until the end of 2019.

2017
In round 1 of the 2017 NRL season, Field made his NRL debut for St. George against the Penrith Panthers. He saw his next two games in round 10 and 11, after injuries to the Dragons' top squad.

2018
Field played two first grade games for the 2018 season, both of them coming off the bench.

2019
Field made a total of 6 appearances for St George in the 2019 NRL season as the club finished second last on the table.
In November 2019, it was announced that Field had been released by the club.

2020
On 20 February, Field signed a train-and-trial contract with Parramatta after his move to English side Leeds broke down.  Field played in the club's 28-24 trial game loss against South Sydney.

On 24 May, Field signed a contract to join the Parramatta development squad for the rest of the 2020 NRL season.
In round 8, Field made his debut for Parramatta and scored a try as Parramatta defeated North Queensland 42-4 at Bankwest Stadium.
On 12 October, Field was released by the Parramatta club along with ten other players.
Field was announced as a Wigan Warriors player for 2021 on 9 November 2020.

2021
On 26 March, Field featured in his first game for the Wigan Warriors against Leigh Centurions. He played on the wing, a position that he had little experience in. He limped off the pitch early on and did not return. It was later revealed that he had suffered a hamstring injury and would be out of action for at least five months.

2022
In round 2 of the 2022 Super League season, Field scored a hat-trick in Wigan's 34-12 victory over Leeds.
On 28 May, Field played for Wigan in their 2022 Challenge Cup Final win over Huddersfield. On the 4 of September Field made the Super League dream team at Fullback.

References

External links

St. George Illawarra Dragons profile
Dragons profile

1997 births
Living people
Australian people of Irish descent
Australian rugby league players
Indigenous Australian rugby league players
Parramatta Eels players
Rugby league fullbacks
Rugby league five-eighths
Rugby league halfbacks
Rugby league players from New South Wales
St. George Illawarra Dragons players
Wigan Warriors players
Wiradjuri people